Pilón Lajas Biosphere Reserve and Communal Lands (Reserva de Biosfera y Tierra Comunitaria de Origen Pilón Lajas) is a protected area in Bolivia located in the departments of La Paz (Sud Yungas, Larecaja and Franz Tamayo provinces) and Beni (José Ballivián Province), in their northern and western parts, respectively, about 350 km northeast of La Paz and 50 km west of San Borja. It lies largely within the Bolivian Yungas ecoregion.
The main river that flows in the Pilon Lajas area is the Quiquibey River.

As of 2004, the indigenous population of Pilón Lajas was 1,394, distributed across 25 communities. Predominantly these residents are members of the Mosetén, Tsimané, and Tacana peoples, but they also include intermarried Quechuas, Aymaras, Lecos and Yuracarés.

Establishment
Pilón Lajas was declared a biosphere reserve by UNESCO in 1977. The Bolivian government designated it an indigenous territory and biosphere reserve through Supreme Decree 23110, issued in 1992. The  multiethnic Tsimané Moseten Regional Council (CRTM) was formed in 1992 and received the title to the reserve as a Native Community Land or TCO in 1997.

References

External links 
 www.parkswatch.org / Pilón Lajas Biosphere Reserve and Communal Lands 
 Reserva de Biosfera y Tierra Comunitaria de Origen PILÓN LAJAS (Spanish)

Protected areas of Bolivia
Geography of La Paz Department (Bolivia)
Geography of Beni Department
Protected areas established in 1992
Biosphere reserves of Bolivia
Native Community Lands in Bolivia